Shannon Nishi-Patton (born March 6, 1985) is an American karateka. She won the gold medal in the women's kumite -50 kg event at the 2019 Pan American Games held in Lima, Peru. She also won the gold medal in the women's kumite -55 kg event at the 2011 Pan American Games in Guadalajara, Mexico.

Career 

In 2004, she won one of the bronze medals in the  women's kumite 53 kg event at the World Karate Championships held in Monterrey, Mexico.

The following year, she competed in the women's kumite -53 kg event at the 2005 World Games held in Duisburg, Germany. She was eliminated in the elimination round where she won one out of three matches.

Achievements

References

External links 
 

Living people
1985 births
Place of birth missing (living people)
American female karateka
Competitors at the 2005 World Games
Pan American Games medalists in karate
Pan American Games gold medalists for the United States
Medalists at the 2011 Pan American Games
Medalists at the 2019 Pan American Games
Karateka at the 2011 Pan American Games
Karateka at the 2019 Pan American Games
20th-century American women
21st-century American women